Hardy Krüger Jr. (born 9 May 1968) is a German actor. He is the son of the German actor-writer Hardy Krüger and the Italian painter Francesca Marazzi.

Life 
Krüger was born in Lugano, Switzerland. Shortly after his birth, his father took his wife and son to Tanzania to live on the farm which had served as the backdrop for the film Hatari!, in which Krüger senior had appeared. The younger Krüger attended an international school in Germany and then, after training as a bartender, in 1989 he took acting classes in Los Angeles and acted in US television shows. In an interview in Volle Kanne (ZDF) Hardy Krüger Jr. stated he had also completed training as a chef. After graduating in 1991 he began his career in Germany with an appearance in the ARD series Nicht von schlechten Eltern and with the lead role in Gegen den Wind. He has since appeared in several international productions such as Le Cocu magnifique (France, 1999), Asterix and Obelix vs Caesar (France, 1999) and Roger Young's Dracula. He also took a lead role in the 2004 Stauffenberg, which was awarded the Deutscher Fernsehpreis for Best Film. In May 2006 he first appeared as the replacement for Christian Wolff in ZDF's Forsthaus Falkenau, in which he now plays the lead role of the forester Stefan Leitner.

Krüger is a UNICEF ambassador against child prostitution, a role for which he was rewarded by Kinderlachen with the "Kind-Award 2006". He has also become a patron of the charity "TukTuk-Tour" from Asia to Europe. He also accompanied Bundesminister Sigmar Gabriel on the creation of the Naturallianz by the CBD-COP9. His first marriage produced two sons and ended in divorce. In 2009 he remarried to Austrian communications trainer and painter Katrin Fehringer, with whom he lived in Starnberg near Munich and with whom he adopted a girl from Thailand in 2009. They also have a son (who died of crib death) and another daughter. They divorced in 2015.

Selective filmography 
1992–1996: Nicht von schlechten Eltern (TV series, 25 episodes), as Pascal Neumann
1995–1999: Gegen den Wind (TV series, 51 episodes), as Sven Westermann
1999: Michele Strogoff - Il corriere dello Zar (TV film), as Ivan Ogareff
1999: Le Cocu magnifique (TV film), as Petrus
1999: Asterix & Obelix Take On Caesar, as Tragicomix
1999: Contaminated Man, as Plant Manager
2001: Bel Ami – Liebling der Frauen (TV film), as Julius De Rooy
2002: Vortex, as Vincent
2002: Dracula (TV film), as Jonathan Harker
2003: Nancy & Frank – A Manhattan Love Story, as Frank Wagner
2003: Je reste!, as John
2004: Stauffenberg, as Werner von Haeften
2005: Die Schokoladenkönigin
2006: Plötzlich Opa
2006–2013 : Forsthaus Falkenau, lead role as forester Stefan Leitner
2009: Lilly Schönhauer – Paulas Traum
2010: 
2011: Serengeti

References

External links 
 

1968 births
Living people
People from Lugano
German male television actors
German male film actors
German people of Italian descent
20th-century German male actors
21st-century German male actors